Gregg Hammann (born 1963) is an American businessman who was the president of the Nautilus Corporation from 2003–2007 and a vice president of The Coca-Cola Company from 1996 to 2000.

Early life
Hammann grew up on a farm near Bellevue, Iowa and attended Bellevue High School. He received a BBA from the University of Iowa (1981–1984), and earned his MBA from the University of Wisconsin–Madison.  At Iowa, he played wide receiver for Hawkeyes coach Hayden Fry.

Business career
Hammann managed the Scope and Crest brands for consumer products giant Procter & Gamble. He developed a business program for 
shoe marketer Famous Footwear that supported the company's plan to triple its retail presence.  Hammann served as general manager of the Canadian division of battery maker Rayovac. He then was named a vice president of The Coca-Cola Company from 1996 to 2000, where he led the National Account fountain group. Hammann was chief customer officer for global apparel giant Levi Strauss & Co. from 2001 to 2003. 

Hammann joined Nautilus Corporation in 2003, replacing Brian Cook, who had held the CEO position for 17 years.  Under Hammann's leadership in 2005, Nautilus launched a three-year plan to leverage its five  brands, Nautilus, Bowflex, Schwinn Fitness, Stairmaster, and Pearl Izumi. Hammann resigned in August 2007.  Hammann was replaced by Robert Falcone, who was named to the positions of president and chief executive.  A report of Falcone's appointment noted that Nautilus had encountered financial difficulties due to increased distribution of the company's Bowflex machines and apparel lines to sports retailers just as consumer spending sharply tailed off. Hammann was also CEO at Metacommunications, based in Iowa City, IA.

In 2008, Hammann returned to his home town, Bellevue, Iowa, to coach track and football at Bellevue High. In 2009, he was named the head football coach at Beckman High School in Dyersville, Iowa.  From 2008 till September 2012 he was the CEO at Power Plate International Limited, which manufactures fitness equipment and also CEO at Action Advisors.

References

Living people
American chief executives of manufacturing companies
Iowa Hawkeyes football players
People from Jackson County, Iowa
1963 births
People from Dyersville, Iowa
Levi Strauss & Co. people